Saifeddine Nejmaoui (born May 5, 1981) is a Tunisian boxer who won the lightweight division at the 2007 All-Africa Games and twice competed at the Olympic Games: 2004 and 2008.

In Athens 2004 he lost his first match to Frenchman Khedafi Djelkhir (13:38). He qualified for the Athens Games by winning the gold medal at the 1st AIBA African 2004 Olympic Qualifying Tournament in Casablanca, Morocco. In the final of the event he defeated Uganda's Brian Mayanja.

Nejmaoui won the African Championships in 2005. At the All-Africa Games he won the lightweight title in Algiers defeating Owethu Mbira in the semis. At the qualification he won all his matches including against Hamza Kramou, but his draw at the Olympic Games matched him with reigning Olympic Featherweight Champion Aleksei Tishchenko and he lost on points (2:10).

Results

External links
 Bio
 African 2005
 2008 qualifier

1981 births
Living people
Lightweight boxers
Boxers at the 2004 Summer Olympics
Boxers at the 2008 Summer Olympics
Olympic boxers of Tunisia
Tunisian male boxers
African Games gold medalists for Tunisia
African Games medalists in boxing
Competitors at the 2007 All-Africa Games
21st-century Tunisian people
20th-century Tunisian people